Noel Slade is an Australian former professional rugby league footballer who played in the 1990s. He was a foundation player for the North Queensland Cowboys.

Playing career
In Round 22 of the 1995 ARL season, Slade made his first grade debut in the North Queensland Cowboys 66-4 loss to the Sydney Bulldogs. After leaving the Cowboys, he played for Centrals in Townsville before moving back to Ivanhoes in Cairns.

References

Australian rugby league players
North Queensland Cowboys players
Living people
Year of birth missing (living people)
Place of birth missing (living people)